North Sichuan Road is a station on Line 10 of the Shanghai Metro. It began operation on April 10, 2010 and is located on North Sichuan Road.

References 
 

Railway stations in Shanghai
Shanghai Metro stations in Hongkou District
Railway stations in China opened in 2010
Line 10, Shanghai Metro